Westwood High School (WHS) is a public high school in Westwood, Massachusetts, United States. It is part of the Westwood Public Schools district. It is ranked #14 by Boston as one of the best public high schools in Boston.

Athletics 

Westwood High School's mascot is the wolverine and competes in the Tri-Valley League (TVL).

Notable alumni 
 Jackie MacMullan, freelance newspaper sportswriter

References

External links 
 

Schools in Norfolk County, Massachusetts
Public high schools in Massachusetts